This is a list of cast members who have appeared in Acapulco Shore.

Current cast members 
This is a list of the current cast members appearing in the show in order of their first appearance.

Former cast members 
This is a list of the current cast members appearing in the show in order of their first appearance.

Notes

Duration of cast

Notes 

 Key:  = Cast member is featured in this episode.
 Key:  = Cast member arrives in the house.
 Key:  = Cast member voluntarily leaves the house.
 Key:  = Cast member leaves and returns to the house in the same episode.
 Key:  = Cast member returns to the house.
 Key:  = Cast member features in this episode, but outside of the house.
 Key:  = Cast member does not feature in this episode.
 Key:  = Cast member leaves the series.
 Key:  = Cast member returns to the series.
 Key:  = Cast member is removed from the series.
 Key:  = Cast member features in this episode despite not being an official cast member at the time.

Other appearances 
As well as appearing in Acapulco Shore, some of the cast members have competed in other reality TV shows.

 La Academia
 Luis Caballero – Season 10 (2012) – Eliminated
 Bailando por un Sueño
 Charlotte Caniggia – Season 8, Season 11, Season 14 & Season 15 – 12th, 18th, 17th & 3rd Eliminated
 Mitad y Mitad
 Brenda Zambrano – Season 1 (2014) – Withdrew
 Big Brother México
 Eduardo Miranda – Season 4 (2015) – Winner
 L'Isola dei Famosi' 
 Charlotte Caniggia – Season 10 (2015) – 2nd Eliminated
 Gran Hermano VIP 
 Charlotte Caniggia – Season 4 (2016) – 8th Eliminated
 Elettra Lamborghini – Season 5 (2017) – 13th Eliminated
 Reto 4 Elementos
 Victor Ortiz – Reto 4 Elementos: La Búsqueda (2018) – Injured
 Resistiré
 Charlotte Caniggia – Season 1 (2019) – Withdrew
 Ignacia Michelson – Season 1 (2019) – 12th Eliminated
 Manelyk Gonzalez – Season 1 (2019) – Finalist
 Alba Zepeda – Season 2 (2022) – Finalist
 Brenda Zambrano– Season 2 (2022) – Ejerted
 Eduardo "Chile" Miranda – Season 2 (2022) – Finalist
 Elizabeth Varela – Season 2 (2022) – Ejerted
 Fernando Lozada – Season 2 (2022) – Runner-Up
 Exatlón United States
 Fernando Lozada – Season 4 (2020) – Eliminated 
 Exatlón United States: Torneo de Temporadas
 Fernando Lozada – Winner
 Cantando por un Sueño
 Charlotte Caniggia – Season 5 (2021 – 19th Eliminated
 Guerreros México
 Luis Caballero – Season 1 & 2 (2020 & 2021) – Finalist
 Anahí Izalí – Season 1 (2020) – 7th Eliminated
 Brenda Zambrano – Season 1 (2020) – 4th Eliminated
 La casa de los famosos
 Anahí Izali – Season 1 (2021) – 2nd Eliminated
 Manelyk Gonzalez – Season 1 (2021) – Runner-Up
 Brenda Zambrano – Season 2 (2022) – 2th Eliminated
 Luis Caballero – Season 2 (2022) – 3th Eliminated
 Dania Méndez – Season 3 (2022) – In the game
 José Rodríguez – Season 3 (2022) – In the game
 MasterChef Celebrity Argentina
 Charlotte Caniggia – Season 3 (2021-2022) – 8th Eliminated
Survivor México
Jacky Ramirez – Season 3 (2022) – 10th Eliminated

Cast changes 
The official cast members were revealed on 4 October 2013. They are Luis Caballero, Tadeo Fernández, Manelyk González, Joyce Islas, Talía Loaiza, Fernando Lozada, Luis Méndez, and Karime Pindter.

In April 2014, Joyce Islas announced that she had left Acapulco Shore and would not be returning for the second series. Brenda Zambrano had joined the cast for series two. On 28 July 2015 it was announced that Talía Loaiza had been sacked from the show. In March 2016, Zambrano announced that he would not be returning for the third season. It was confirmed that new cast members Danik Michell, Nicole Olin and Tania Gattas joined the cast. Olin leave show on 26 July 2016. After the third season, original cast members Fernando Lozada and Tadeo Fernández, in addition to Gattas, did not return for the show's fourth season.

In March 2017, the one-season special "Acapulco Shore: New Generation" was revealed, featuring ten potential new cast members. It was about Eduardo Miranda, who had previously appeared in the fourth season of Big Brother Mexico, Alexya Larios, Antonio Tiburcio, Christian Herrera, Gabriela Ruiz, Humbie Vallin, Luisa Cavazos, Marlen Martínez, Sofía Beltrán and Víctor Ortiz. Before the selection, Sofia Beltrán was fired. Alexya Larios, Antonio Tiburcio, Christian Herrera, Gabriela Ruiz, and Victor Ortiz were selected to become permanent for season four. It was later confirmed that Tadeo Fernández, who left during the previous series, returned for the fourth season. Alexya Larios, Antonio Tiburcio, Christian Herrera, Danik Michell, Gabriela Ruiz, Luis Méndez and Víctor Ortiz left the show and did not return in the fifth season. Brenda Zambrano, Nicole Olin and Tania Gattas appeared recurrently throughout this season.

On April 17, 2018, three former cast members Brenda Zambrano, Eduardo Miranda, and Fernanzo Lozada returned for the fifth season, which also includes new cast members Cintia Cossio, Elettra Lamborghini from Super Shore, Erick Sandoval, Leslie Gallardo, and Maria Usi. Cossio and Lamborghini left the show during the seventh and tenth episodes of the fifth season. Gallardo, Sandoval and Usi left the show after the fifth season. In addition, Luis Méndez, Talía Loaiza and Víctor Ortiz made brief returns.

Series sixth featured the return of original cast members Luis Méndez and Talía Loaiza, and featured new cast members Anahí Izali, Dania Méndez, Jibranne Bazán, Rocío Sánchez, and Xavier Meade. Izali was expelled in episode fourteen. Brenda Zambrano and Fernando Lozada did not appear in the following series. Season seventh featured new cast members Fernanda Moreno Ignacia Michelson, Isabel Castro, José Arana, and Ramiro Giménez. Talía Loaiza returns to the show after her last appearance during the previous season. On August 11, 2020, Dania Méndez left the program. The original cast members Luis Caballero, Luis Méndez, Manelyk González, Tadeo Fernández and Talía Loaiza, as well as Rocío Sánchez and Xavier Meade, did not return to the program for the eighth season.

Series eight introduced twelve new cast members: Aarón Albores, Alba Zepeda, Charlotte Cannigia, Diana Chiquete, Diego Garsiasela, Eduardo Schobert, Jacky Ramirez, Jaylin Castellanos and Matheus Crivella. Ramiro Giménez returned to season eight after his last appearance in the previous season. During the seventh episode of this season, Aarón Albores was removed from the show after threatening to kill another cast member, later Beni Falcón left the series in episode ten. Ignacia Michelson announced her departure from the program to focus on her mental health. Matheus Crivella also did not return to the show after joining Rio Shore. Despite announcing her participation for one more season, Charlotte Caniggia did not return to the show, in addition to Diana Chiquete, Eduardo Schobert and Ramiro Giménez.

In December 2021, the return of Beni Falcón was announced for the ninth season of the program, in addition to the debut of Carlos Pantoja, José Rodríguez, Nati Peláez and Santiago Santana. Later, in January 2022, MTV announced the participation of Diego Garciasela and Jibranne Bazán, plus the return of Rocío Sánchez after having appeared for the last time in the seventh season and the incorporation of Andrés Altafulla. Diego decided to leave the show in the sixth episode to take a break and recover physically and mentally. Kelly Medanie, Kelly Reales, and Maria Fletcher joined the show in the seventh and ninth episodes, respectively. In June 2022, it was announced via social media that none of the rookies from the ninth season would be returning to the show for the tenth season. In August 2022, the return of the original member Luis Méndez was secured, as well as five new members, including Abel Robles, Andrés Cervantes, Elizabeth Varela, Ricardo Ochoa and Sebastián Gálvez. Jaylin Castellanos and Rocío Sánchez made a brief return to the show, while Roberto Mora and Alejandra Varela joined the show for the first time in the fifth and sixth chapters, respectively.

References 

Warsaw Shore